Art Bergmann is the third studio album by Art Bergmann, released in 1991 on Polygram Records.

The album included the singles "Faithlessly Yours", "If She Could Sing" and "Message from Paul". "Faithlessly Yours" peaked at #11 on RPM'''s rock charts, and at #50 in the magazine's general RPM100. "If She Could Sing" peaked at #63 in the RPM100. "Message from Paul", a song about an obsessive Paul Westerberg fan, charted at rock radio but did not cross over to the mainstream charts.

In 2017, Bergmann released a remastered edition of the album under the new title Remember Her Name''.

Track listing
All songs written by Art Bergmann except where noted.

References

1991 albums
Art Bergmann albums